The Sablatnig P.III was an airliner produced in Germany in the early 1920s.

Development

A contemporary account identifies the P.III as Germany's first aircraft purposefully-designed as a commercial passenger plane. It was a high-wing, strut-braced monoplane of conventional design powered by a single engine in the nose (either a 200-hp Benz, or a 260-hp Maybach). Later the British 258-hp Armstrong Siddeley Puma engine was the usual power plant. The crew of two, a pilot and a navigator or mechanic, were accommodated in separate open cockpits in tandem. These were behind the enclosed six seat passenger cabin in the center of the fuselage. Passengers entered the cabin through a door directly from the ground, rather than having to climb over the side of the aircraft, or up a ladder. The P.III's cabin offered passengers the comfort of an expensive automobile. The structure was of wood throughout, with the fuselage skinned in plywood. The wings and horizontal stabiliser folded for storage or rail transport, and indeed, P.IIIs carried their own tent as a portable hangar.

Operational history
This aircraft was one of the few approved as a civilian, not military type by the ILÜK (Interallierte Luftfahrt-Überwachungs-Kommission, Inter-allied Aviation Control Commission) for production in Germany after World War I. However under the Treaty of Versailles all aircraft production was forbidden in Germany for a period of six months during the year 1920, and all existing aircraft, both military and civilian, and including aircraft built after the end of World War I, had to be either handed over to the Allied military or destroyed. As a result, Sablatnig ceased building aircraft. Apparently the existing P.IIIs were either hidden or smuggled out of Germany.

17 Sablatnig P.IIIs were registered in Germany in and after 1921. Fritz Sablatnig, the owner of the Sablatnig company, estimated total production at 30 to 40 examples, including 12 made in Estonia by Dwigatel.
The P.III entered service with a number of airlines in Germany and other countries, including Lloyd Luftverkehr Sablatnig, Deutsche Luft Hansa, Danish Air Express, Aeronaut, as well as with the Swiss Air Force.

Operators

Danish Air Express

Aeronaut

Deutsche Luft-Reederei
Deutscher Aero-Lloyd
Deutsche Luft Hansa
Lloyd Luftverkehr Sablatnig

Swiss Air Force

Specifications

See also

References

Bibliography

 Gerdessen, Frederik. "Estonian Air Power 1918 – 1945". Air Enthusiast, No. 18, April – July 1982. pp. 61–76. .

Sablatnig aircraft
Aircraft manufactured in Estonia
1920s German airliners
Aircraft first flown in 1919
Single-engined tractor aircraft